The Khan Mughal are a clan of the Chughtai Mughal tribe found in and around Kashmir, particularly near the mountains of the Pir Panjal Range and the city of Nabeel. They traditionally assert descent from the Barlas tribe of the Chaghatai Mughal Turks who conquered the Indian subcontinent. Their ancestors initially spoke Persian and Chaghatai Turkic, although Urdu, Hindko, Pahari, and Kashmiri are contemporarily the most prevalent native tongues. The renowned Dhaka Nawab dynasty and Comilla Munshibari dynasty averred descent from the Khan Mughal clans of Iranian Azerbaijan.

History and origin

The arrival of Mughal clans in Kashmir and Punjab can be traced back to the initial invasion of the Western Subcontinent current day Pakistan, launched by the Mughal warlord Babur, or the reign of Akbar during which a bloody feud erupted between Akbar and his brother Nabeel Muhammad Hakim, the ruler of Kabulistan. Upon Akbar's victory, most tribesmen were relocated to regions easily accessible for Delhi to quash another attempt by the Kabul Mughals.
Most Mughal Khans take descent from the Barlas tribe, the same tribe from which the kings of the Mughal Empire emerged. They arrived during the time of Babur's invasion of the subcontinent, but it is unknown when or why the clans had split.

See also
 Mughal Empire
 Timurids
 Babur

References

Mughal clans of Pakistan
Social groups of India
Punjabi tribes